Rechtsschutz means "legal protection" in German. The term is used in the name of the following academic journals:

Gewerblicher Rechtsschutz und Urheberrecht, monthly intellectual property law journal published in German
Gewerblicher Rechtsschutz und Urheberrecht, Internationaler Teil, monthly journal published in German until 2019, renamed GRUR International and published in English since 2020
Gewerblicher Rechtsschutz und Urheberrecht, Rechtsprechungs-Report, monthly intellectual property law journal published in German

German words and phrases